NBC Sports on USA Network is the branding used for NBC Sports produced sporting events on USA Network. Since 2022, USA Network has been the de facto cable home of NBC Sports, following the closure of NBCSN. From 2008 to 2021, NBC Sports programs only aired on USA during rare circumstances. Prior to 2008, sports programs on USA used the branding USA Sports.

Overview
Following the dissolving of USA Sports into NBC Sports after the 2007 Masters, USA Network began deemphasizing sports. During this time NBC Sports properties generally only aired on USA in special cases, such as during the Olympics, Stanley Cup Finals or the final week of the English Premier League season.

Beginning in 2006, USA carried some coverage of top level hockey by cooperating with NBC's coverage of ice hockey at the Winter Olympics in 2006, 2010 and 2014; these games were mostly daytime contests that would not preempt the network's increasingly popular prime time programs.

In early 2006, it was announced that USA was outbid by Golf Channel for its early-round PGA Tour rights, with USA's final season being 2006.  NBC Universal traded away the network's Friday Ryder Cup coverage through 2012 to ESPN for the rights to sign Al Michaels for its new Sunday Night Football.  However, USA did renew its Masters contract for an additional year. USA would televise the 2007 Masters before being outbid by ESPN for future coverage.

USA Network offered daily coverage of the 2008 Summer Olympics through NBC Sports. This would be the USA Network's last Summer Olympics until 2020 because in 2011, Comcast acquired majority control of NBC's parent company NBC Universal from General Electric. This included to rebranding of Versus as NBC Sports Network, which would replace USA Network's summer Olympic coverage.

The Ryder Cup contract, which stipulated cable coverage air on USA, was still controlled by NBC even after it granted ESPN the rights to Friday cable coverage (normally the only day of the event covered on cable). However, in 2010, rain on Friday pushed the singles matches to Monday, necessitating that they air on cable. With NBC having granted only Friday rights to ESPN, the singles matches aired on USA.  Four months later, NBC merged with Golf Channel, making Golf Channel NBC's primary cable outlet for golf.

2010s
USA Network aired 41 hours of coverage of the 2010 Winter Olympics.

As part of a 2011 contract renewal, Comcast's properties earned exclusive national rights for all Stanley Cup playoffs through 2021. Because NBC and NBC Sports Network cannot carry all of the games on those two outlets alone in the first two rounds, other Comcast properties would need to be used; USA was initially not used, due to the risk of preempting its popular prime time lineup, and the company instead used CNBC and NHL Network as the overflow channels for the first four years of the contract. In 2015, Comcast announced that USA would carry some games in the first two rounds of the Stanley Cup Playoffs, mainly on Tuesday and Wednesday nights, returning the NHL to USA for the first time in 30 years (1985).

USA Network aired 43 hours of coverage for the 2014 Winter Olympics.

In 2014, due to NBCSN's coverage of the 2014 Winter Olympics, an English Premier League match between Arsenal and Sunderland aired on USA Network.

In the 2015–16 season, USA Network aired 40 matches from the English Premier League, most during the 10AM ET window. These matches moved to CNBC for the 2016–17 season.

On January 26, 2016, NASCAR announced that the Cheez-It 355 at the Glen from Watkins Glen International would air on USA Network due to NBC and NBCSN's commitments to the Summer Olympics.

In 2017, during the final day of the Premier League season on May 21, USA aired a match between Watford and Manchester City. In 2018, USA would air the same match for the final day of the season on May 10.

USA Network aired 40.5 hours for the 2018 Winter Olympics.

In 2019, during the final day of the Premier League season on May 12, USA aired a match between Manchester United and Cardiff City.

2020s
In 2020, during the final day of the Premier League season on July 26, USA aired a match between Chelsea and Wolverhampton.

USA Network had 388.5 hours of coverage of the 2020 Summer Olympics. The main sports featured were swimming, track and field, diving, beach volleyball, volleyball, cycling, triathlon, team sports basketball, soccer and water polo.

In September 2020, it was announced that USA would carry the September 19 college football game between the Notre Dame Fighting Irish and University of South Florida Bulls. It was the first Notre Dame football game broadcast on USA, whose parent company NBC has owned rights to every Fighting Irish home game since 1991. It was also the first American football game broadcast on the network since World Bowl '92.

Notre Dame's double-overtime win against Clemson on November 7, 2020, was moved temporarily to USA Network, due to coverage of Joe Biden's acceptance speech after being declared consensus winner of the 2020 presidential election.

On January 22, 2021, an internal memo sent by NBC Sports president Pete Bevacqua announced that NBCSN would cease operations by the end of the year, and that USA Network would begin "carrying and/or simulcasting certain NBC Sports programming," including the Stanley Cup Playoffs and NASCAR races, before NBCSN's shutdown. When NBCSN is shuttered, much of its programming will be merged onto USA Network's schedule. Peacock, NBCUniversal's new streaming service, will also carry some of the network's former programming starting in 2022. The move was cited by industry analysts as a response to the impact of the COVID-19 pandemic on the sports and television industries, the acceleration of cord-cutting, as well as formidable competition from rival sports networks such as ESPN and Fox Sports 1, noting the company saw an overall revenue drop by 19% to $6.72 billion. 

In 2021, during the final day of the Premier League season on May 23, USA aired a match between Aston Villa and Chelsea.

In 2021, USA Network aired Cristiano Ronaldo's return to Manchester United on September 11 when Manchester United took on Newcastle.

Following the dissolving of NBCSN in January 2022, USA has become the cable home of Atlantic 10 men and women college basketball games, weekend lead-in coverage of the U.S. Open, U.S. Women's Open, British Open and AIG Women's Open, the cable portion of NBC Sports' NASCAR contract, the cable portion of the NBC Sports' NTT IndyCar Series contract, the cable portion of NBC Sports' IMSA contract and select AMA Supercross Championship races (split with CNBC).

Beginning on January 1, 2022, regular Premier League matches, as well as Premier League Mornings, moved permanently to USA Network.

In January 2022, for the 2022 Winter Olympics, portions of the U.S figure skating championship and U.S speed skating trials aired on USA.

For the 2022 Winter Olympics, USA Network became the de facto cable home of the games, replacing the defunct NBCSN. The network featured 400 hours of Olympic programming, up 1000% from 2018, broadcasting all Olympic sports.

In 2022, USA Network aired 9 games from the new United States Football League (USFL) and aired portions of the World Figure Skating Championships.

Programming

Current programs
College Basketball on USA (1982–1988) (2022–present)
Atlantic 10 men's and women's regular season contests
Atlantic 10 men's tournament, second round and quarterfinals
Summer Olympics (2008, 2020–present)
Golf on USA (2010, 2022–present)
Ryder Cup (2010)
U.S. Open (2022)
U.S. Women's Open (2022)
British Open (2022)
AIG Women's Open (2022)
Winter Olympics (2010–present)Premier League on NBC (2013–present)NASCAR on NBC (2016 (one race), 2022–present (full cable coverage)
Cheez-It 355 at the Glen (2016)IndyCar Series on NBC (2022–present)
Detroit Grand Prix (2022)
Bommarito Automotive Group 500 (2022)
United States Football League (2022–present)
World Figure Skating Championships (2022–present)
WWE (1985–2000, 2005–present)Prime Time Wrestling (1985–1993)Monday Night Raw (1993–2000, 2005–present)NXT (2019–present)SmackDown Live (2015–2019)

Former programsU.S. Open Tennis Championship (2008)NHL on NBC (2015–2021; select playoff games)College Football on USA'' (2020)

See also
NBC Sports on CNBC
USA Network#Sports programming

References

External links

NBC Sports

USA Network Sports
NBC Sports
Sports television in the United States
Mass media companies disestablished in 2007